Pablo Maximiliano Miguel Coronel Vidoz, also known as Pablito Ruiz and Pablo Ruiz, born on (4 May 1975) in Buenos Aires, Argentina, is a singer, actor, and dancer. In 1989, when just 14 years old, he came to prominence with songs like "Proud Girl", "Lady Lady", "Linda", and his cover of Oh Mama, originally recorded by the band Selena y Los Dinos.

After Ricky Martin came out as gay at the end of March 2010, Ruiz claimed in a TV interview with Viviana Canosa to have kissed Martin at a party in Mexico when he was 17 and Martin was around 22. Martin was working on the TV show Muñecos de Papel in Mexico at the time.

In 2014, Ruiz accused the Australian band Tame Impala of plagiarizing the song 'Océano' due to its similarities to Tame Impala's single 'Feels Like We Only Go Backwards'. Ruiz responded by saying he would consult his lawyers about possible legal action, although the accusers later claimed it was a joke.

Has sold more than 4 million albums.
In his last incursion in music, he interpreted a song for the 2015 presidential candidate Daniel Scioli, (just one heartbeat).

Discography 

1985: Pablo Ruiz
1988: Un ángel
1989: Océano
1990: Espejos azules
1992: Irresistible
1994: 60/90
1997: Aire
1999: Was It Something That I Didn't Say?
2001: Jamás
2003: Necesito tus besos
2005: Demasiado tarde
2009: Renacer

References

External links
 Official Website
 Pablo Ruiz on Facebook
 Pablo Ruiz on Twitter

1975 births
21st-century Argentine male singers
Gay singers
Gay dancers
Living people
Argentine LGBT singers
Argentine gay musicians
Singers from Buenos Aires
Argentine child singers
20th-century LGBT people
21st-century LGBT people
LGBT people in Latin music
Bailando por un Sueño (Argentine TV series) participants